21st Century Chase is an album by American jazz saxophonist Fred Anderson, which was recorded in 2009 and released on Delmark. This fourth live recording on Bob Koester's label made at Fred's own club, the Velvet Lounge, documents the finale to a week of concerts honoring Anderson's 80th birthday. He is joined by New Orleans saxophonist Kidd Jordan, guitarist Jeff Parker, bassist Harrison Bankhead and drummer Chad Taylor. The last piece is dedicated to the AACM drummer Alvin Fielder. The event was also filmed and issued on DVD with a bonus track, “Gone But Not Forgotten”, with guess bassist Henry Grimes.

Reception

In his review for AllMusic, Sean Westergaard states:

The JazzTimes review by David Whitels says:

The PopMatters review by Andrew Zender claims:

Track listing
All compositions by Fred Anderson
 "21st Century Chase Pt. I" - 36:13
 "21st Century Chase Pt. II" - 14:13
 "Ode to Alvin Fielder" - 16:00

Personnel
Fred Anderson - tenor sax
Kidd Jordan - tenor sax
Jeff Parker - guitar
Harrison Bankhead - bass
Chad Taylor - drums

References

Sources

2009 live albums
Fred Anderson (musician) live albums
Delmark Records live albums